Holy Trinity College is a theological college in  Highlands, Harare, Zimbabwe founded in August 2003. It is an associate college of the Catholic University of Zimbabwe and was founded by several Roman Catholic religious orders: Redemptorists CSsR, Franciscans OFM and Carmelite O Carm. The board of directors is made up of senior officials of these orders.

References

 https://www.africa2trust.com/Member/?l=1&c=21&sid=27984&glx=0&CatID=>
 http://www.jesuitszimbabwe.co.zw/index.php/component/content/article/99-news/624-catholic-university-enrolling-students-now-for-2015

External links

Catholic University of Zimbabwe
Catholic Church in Zimbabwe
Catholic universities and colleges in Africa